Saint Elairs Cay is a small uninhabited island in the Grenadines. It belongs to the island State of Saint Vincent and the Grenadines and lies between the islands of Bequia and Petit Nevis.

References

Uninhabited islands of Saint Vincent and the Grenadines